The  is a landmark in the port city of Kobe, Japan. The sightseeing tower was completed in 1963 and was temporarily closed from late 2009 to 28 April 2010 and again to present for renovation. It is located in Chuo-ku, Kobe, Hyogo Prefecture, Japan.

History
The Kobe Port Tower was designed by the Nikken Sekkei Company and it was completed in 1963.  The maintenance of the whole facility began since November 2009 and The Kobe Port Tower was closed to the public since 12 January 2010 for refurbishment.  It was renovated and re-opened to public for the sightseeing deck on 19 March 2010 but Kobe Port Tower completes the installation of 7000 light-emitting diodes (LED) lighting equipment with 40 lighting effects starting from the re-opening day by the date of 28 April 2010. The facility was once again closed to the public since 27 September 2021 for renovation and seismic retrofitting.  It is slated to reopen by 2023.

Architectural features
The Tower is surrounded by 32 red steel staves as symbolize welcome vessels return to the shore.

Usage
Kobe Port Tower has two sections; the ground floors sections and the sightseeing sections are separated and have three and five floors respectively.

At the base of the tower, the first floor is mainly to sell souvenirs and restaurants.  Souvenir shops and ticket office to the sightseeing level is locating on the second floor, and third floor is the elevator exit and display floor.

Moreover, it is observatory floor with the second floor and the rest floors are sightseeing decks. The third floor is a 360 rotate cafe with 20 minutes for a round. Fourth floor can see Awajishima and Osaka Bay and the fifth floor can see Mount Rokkō and Kansai International Airport.

In popular culture
Gamera vs. Barugon
Ultra Seven
Godzilla vs. SpaceGodzilla
Ultraman Mebius & Ultraman Brothers

See also
 List of towers
 Meriken Park
 Port of Kobe
 Sydney Tower
 Tokyo Tower
 Sapporo TV Tower
 Nagoya TV Tower
 Kyoto Tower
 Canton Tower

References

 Architects' Journal, "Shuttleworth stunned by Vortex's 'clear similarity' to Kobe Tower", 8 July 2004

External links

  
 

Towers completed in 1963
Buildings and structures in Kobe
High-tech architecture
Hyperboloid structures
Lattice shell structures
Modernist architecture in Japan
Observation towers in Japan
Tourist attractions in Kobe
Towers with revolving restaurants
1963 establishments in Japan